Lebanon Senior High School (LHS) houses grades nine through twelve for the Lebanon School District, and is located in Lebanon, Pennsylvania. The current building, which also serves as district headquarters, opened to students for the 1969–70 school year.  The school, with a unique architecture featuring three circular buildings, underwent extensive renovations completed in early 2013.  
The school's mascot is the cedar tree.  In 2013, the cedar tree mascot, Rooty, was featured in a mini-series on HULU entitled Behind the Mask.

Campus

Each of the school's three buildings includes a principal occupant (Library, Gymnasium, or Auditorium) which is used to identify the specific building.  The "Library" building contains most of the school's classrooms and the library itself features a glass dome ceiling.  In addition to the gym, the "Gymnasium" building includes the school's cafeteria.  Since the renovations, the offices of the high school are located in the West in-fill and the district offices are found in the North in-fill.  The renovations also resulted in the enclosure of the school's courtyard into a large atrium.

Programs

Lebanon High School is well known for its music programs. It has many performing groups including: 
Concert Choir,
Chamber Singers,
Show Choir,
Jazz Choir, Orchestra,
Chamber Orchestra,
Symphonic Band,
Jazz Band, Percussion Ensemble,
and Marching Band.

Students participate in PMEA District 7, LLMEA music festivals, and other festivals/events.

The music department also produces a Broadway-quality musical every spring. Musicals from the last few years include Cinderella, West Side Story, and Newsies.

Notable alumni

Walter L. J. Bayler - Brigadier General in the United States Marine Corps, known as the "Last Man Off Wake Island."
Skip Stahley - college football head coach (Class of 1926)
Sam Bowie - NBA center (Class of 1979)
Kerry Collins - NFL quarterback (transferred out as sophomore (1987), Class of 1990)
Dick Shiner - NFL quarterback (Class of 1960)
Jared Odrick - NFL defensive end  (Class of 2006)
Bobby Gerhart - NASCAR/ARCA race car driver (Class of 1976)
Thomas Albert - Composer (Class of 1967)
Jaynne Bittner - All-American Girls Professional Baseball League  pitcher  (Class of 1944)

References

External links

 Official Lebanon High School website

Public high schools in Pennsylvania
Educational institutions established in 1969
Schools in Lebanon County, Pennsylvania
1852 establishments in Pennsylvania